Bendinelli is an Italian surname. Notable people with the surname include:

Angelo Bendinelli (1876–1942), Italian tenor
Cesare Bendinelli ( 1542–1617), Italian trumpeter
Davide Bendinelli (born 1974), Italian politician

See also
Bandinelli (surname)

Italian-language surnames